Gloucester Leisure Centre was a leisure centre located at Station Road in Gloucester, England. A new leisure centre (branded GL1) was built nearby as a replacement.

The original centre was also used as a concert venue hosting artists such as Thin Lizzy, Duran Duran and The Police.

References

Music venues in Gloucestershire
Defunct sports venues in Gloucestershire
Buildings and structures in Gloucester